Linda Wynne is a former American politician who served as a member of the Washington House of Representatives from her appointment on June 8, 1978, until after she lost the next general election to Republican Ray Isaacson.  She represented Washington's 8th legislative district as a Democrat.

References

Democratic Party members of the Washington House of Representatives
Women state legislators in Washington (state)